The 2023 Atlantic Hockey Tournament was the 19th edition of the Atlantic Hockey Tournament. It was played between March 3 and March 18, 2023. By winning the tournament, Canisius earned Atlantic Hockey's automatic bid to the 2023 NCAA Division I men's ice hockey tournament.

Format
The tournament featured three rounds of play. The top eight teams according to the conference standings participated. In the Quarterfinals, the 1st-seed hosted the 8th-seed, the 2nd-seed hosted the 7th-seed, the 3rd-seed hosted the 6th-seed and the 4th-seed hosted the 5th-seed in a best-of-three series. The teams that advanced out of the quarterfinals are reseeded in the Semifinal with the highest remaining seed hosting the lowest remaining seed and the second highest remaining seed hosting the second lowest remaining seed, again in a best-of-three series. The teams that advance from the Semifinals meet for a Championship game held at the home venue of the higher seed. The winner of Atlantic Hockey Tournament Championship received the conference's automatic bid to the 2023 NCAA Division I Men's Ice Hockey Tournament.

Conference standings

Bracket
Teams are reseeded for the semifinals

Note: * denotes overtime period(s)

Results
Note: All game times are local.

Quarterfinals

(1) RIT vs. (8) Mercyhurst

(2) American International vs. (7) Holy Cross

(3) Sacred Heart vs. (6) Niagara

(4) Canisius vs. (5) Army

Semifinals

(1) RIT vs. (7) Holy Cross

(4) Canisius vs. (6) Niagara

Championship

(4) Canisius vs. (7) Holy Cross

Tournament awards

All-Tournament Team
G: Jacob Barczewski* (Canisius)
D: Jack Robilotti (Holy Cross)
D: Jackson Decker (Canisius)
F: Liam McLinskey (Holy Cross)
F: Keaton Mastrodonato (Canisius)
F: Nick Bowman (Canisius)

* Most Valuable Player(s)

References

Atlantic Hockey Tournament
Atlantic Hockey Tournament
Atlantic Hockey Tournament